Deh Tut-e Sofla (also Romanized as Deh Tūt-e Soflá; also known as Dehtūī, Deh Tūt, Deh Tuveh, and Dehtū-ye Pā’īn) is a village in Sharwineh Rural District, Kalashi District, Javanrud County, Kermanshah Province, Iran. At the 2006 census, its population was 322, in 68 families.

References 

Populated places in Javanrud County